Nosratabad, Lorestan may refer to:

Nosratabad, Azna, a village in Azna County, Lorestan Province, Iran
Nosratabad, Delfan, a village in Delfan County, Lorestan Province, Iran
Nosratabad-e Olya, a village in Delfan County, Lorestan Province, Iran
Nosratabad-e Sofla, a village in Delfan County, Lorestan Province, Iran